Chitari  is located   about 163 km southeast of Udaipur, Rajasthan.

Demography
There are 1219 houses in village.
 India census, Chitari has a population of 5545. Males constitute 2699 of the population and females 2846. Chitari has an average literacy rate of 56%, lower than the national average of 59.5%: male literacy is 67%, and female literacy is 47%. In Chitari, 14.42% of the population is under 6 years of age.

Notes and references

Cities and towns in Dungarpur district